Sascha Gura (born Eugenie Therese Gura; 9 June 1896 – 1 April 1946) was a German stage and film actress active in the silent era.

Selected filmography
 The Dance of Death (1919)
 The Hunchback and the Dancer (1920)
 The Prince of the Mountains (1921)
 The Devil and Circe (1921)
 The Love Affairs of Hector Dalmore (1921)
 Mignon (1922)
 Two Worlds (1922)
 Playing with Destiny (1924)
 Fever for Heights (1924)
 The Doomed (1924)
 Trenck (1932)

References

Bibliography
 Hardt, Ursula. From Caligari to California: Erich Pommer's life in the International Film Wars. Berghahn Books, 1996.

External links

1896 births
1946 deaths
German musical theatre actresses
German film actresses
German silent film actresses
20th-century German actresses
Actresses from Munich
Deaths from cancer in Germany